{{DISPLAYTITLE:C21H28O6}}
The molecular formula C21H28O6 (molar mass: 376.44 g/mol, exact mass: 376.1886 u) may refer to:

 Bis-HPPP, or 2,2-Bis[4(2,3-hydroxypropoxy)phenyl]propane
 Oxisopred

Molecular formulas